Kenneth Caskey (June 23, 1904 – April 29, 1993) was an American athlete. He competed in the men's hammer throw at the 1928 Summer Olympics.

References

External links
 

1904 births
1993 deaths
Athletes (track and field) at the 1928 Summer Olympics
American male hammer throwers
Olympic track and field athletes of the United States